The Women's World Games were the first international women's sports events in track and field. The games were held four times between 1922 and 1934. They were established by Alice Milliat and the Fédération Sportive Féminine Internationale (FSFI) to compensate for the lack of women's sports at the Olympic Games. The games were an important step towards women's equality in sports. A forerunner tournament was held in Monte Carlo in March 1921.

Background
Women were allowed to take part in the Olympic games since 1900 (II Olympiad in golf and tennis, III Olympiad in archery, IV Olympiad in archery, figure skating and tennis, at the V Olympiad swimming was added as well).

In 1919 Milliat started discussions with the International Olympic Committee (IOC) and the IAAF to also include women's track and field athletics events in the 1924 Olympic Games. On refusal Milliat organised a first competition in 1921 called the  Women's Olympiad in Monte Carlo; further editions were held in 1922 and 1923. In 1924 the 1924 Women's Olympiad was held at Stamford Bridge in London.

On 31 October 1921, Milliat then formed La Fédération Sportive Féminine Internationale (FSFI) with the purpose to oversight international women's sporting events and the inclusion of women's events in the Olympics.

A European version of the women's games was hosted in 1931 in Florence and was known as the Olimpiadi della Grazia (Olympics of Grace).

Events
In response to the refusal of the IAAF to include women's events in the 1924 Olympic Games the FSFI also organized the first Women's Olympic Games in Paris in 1922.

The IOC objected to the FSFI using the word "Olympic" in the title of its events. After negotiations the IOC and the IAAF therefore agreed to include 10 athletic events in the 1928 Olympic Games and in exchange Milliat altered the title to "Women's World Games". They finally included only 5 events (100 meters, 800 meters, 4 x 100 meters, high jump and discus ) and only as an experiment.

The FSFI did not find this satisfactory and organised the third Women's World Games in Prague in 1930 and the fourth games in London in 1934.

Following some protracted arguments between the FSFI on the one hand and the IOC and IAAF on the other, the FSFI and an IAAF commission agreed that the IAAF should take control of all international women's athletic events in return for the IAAF recognising all FSFI records, a complete programme of women's Olympic events, and the IAAF holding the fifth Women's World Games in Vienna in 1938. In the event, while the 1936 IAAF Congress agreed to recognise FSFI records, it otherwise only agreed to proposing a somewhat expanded programme of Olympic events to the IOC (the IOC refused) and holding a programme of women's events in the 1938 European Athletics Championships in place of the Women's World Games. The FSFI ceased operations in 1938 without ever accepting or rejecting the IAAF's decisions.

Sites
Four regular events were held, a planned 5th was cancelled as women participated in the 1938 European Athletics Championships.

Further reading 
Ofer Idels (2021). How to lose gracefully in an internationally selfish world: gender, the “New Jew” and the underestimation of athletic performance in interwar Palestine, Journal of Modern Jewish Studies

References

 
Defunct athletics competitions
Recurring sporting events established in 1922
Defunct multi-sport events
Recurring events disestablished in 1934
Women's athletics competitions